Marko Miljanov Popović (25 April 1833 – 2 February 1901) was a Brda chieftain and Montenegrin general and writer.

He entered the service of Danilo I, the first secular Prince of Montenegro in the modern era, and led his armed Kuči tribe against the Ottoman Empire in the wars of 1861–62 and 1876–78, distinguishing himself as an able military leader. He managed to unite his tribe with Montenegro in 1874. There was later a rift between Miljanov and Prince Nikola I. He was also an accomplished writer who gained repute for his descriptions of Montenegrin society.

His grand-daughter Olgivanna Lloyd Wright headed Frank Lloyd Wright's iconic fellowship and foundation in the United States.

Biography
Marko was born in the village of Medun on 25 April (St. Mark's Day) 1833, and was given the name "Marko" accordingly. His father was Miljan Jankov Popović, his mother Borika, born in Oraovo. He was baptized by Orthodox priest Spasoje Jokov Popović.

The village of Medun was located in the Kuči tribe (in present-day Podgorica municipality, Montenegro) of the Brda (Highland) region. The tribe at the time was de facto independent from the Ottoman Empire as well as the direct rule of Petar II Petrović-Njegoš.  The tribe was caught up in internal blood feuding since 1825, for the next 50 years, with brotherhoods (clans) plotting with the Pasha of Scutari or other tribes to deal with their enemies. Like his fellow highlanders, Miljanov took part in hajdučija (guerilla fighting) against the Ottomans in the region.
 
In 1856, he came to the Montenegrin capital Cetinje and entered the service of Prince Danilo in his guards unit called perjanici. For his bravery and successes in raids on Ottoman territory and as a man of confidence, he was awarded in 1862 the position of judge and head of Bratonožići tribe (that neighboured Kuči). For his work on the unification of Kuči with Montenegro in 1874, he had a price set on his head by the Ottomans. The same year saw his appointment to the Montenegrin Senate (from 1879 transformed into a State Council). In the 1876–78 war against the Ottomans, he was one of three commanders that victoriously led Montenegrin forces in the Battle of Fundina. In 1879 the Brda forces under his supreme command were defeated by the Albanian irregulars in the Battle of Novšiće, fought for the territory of Plav and Gusinje. After a fierce disagreement with Prince Nikola in 1882, he had to leave the State Council and decided to retire from public life to his native Medun. Although he was 50 years old, Marko Miljanov, who was illiterate like the most of his countrymen, decided to learn to write. He explained his urge in a foreword to the lost manuscript of his epic songs with the words: "Dear Serb brother, if you had the chance to see the heroes that I have seen, your heart would give you no peace until you have responded to the heroes who die merrily for their own and rights of all of us."

He died at Herceg Novi in 1901.

Works 
Marko Miljanov died before any of his works were published. All works were originally published in Serbia, as Marko was a well-known dissident to King Nicholas.

Examples of Humanity and Bravery, his most important work, is a collection of true anecdotes depicting practical examples of achieved ethical ideal Montenegrins of his time strived for. It is a lasting monument to the otherwise unsung heroes of the Montenegrin struggle for independence in the 19th century. The anecdotes describe common and humble people, their language and customs and their deeds that made other Montenegrins and Albanians admire them. Marko's language and phrase is plain and coarse, however, his message is resounding.
The Kuči Tribe in Folk Stories and Poems, his second published book, is a collection of historical, folkloric and ethnographical (anthropological) data on the Kuči tribe.
Life and the Customs of Albanians, is a work on the immediate neighboring Albanian Catholic tribes which describes their culture and daily life. Written in 1907 describing the customs of the Albanian malesoris (highlanders). Although he spent a lifetime fighting the Albanians, he was also much fascinated and an admirer. The book was published posthumously. The book describes the culture of Northern Albanian highlanders (the "Malissori"), their customs (including besa, "oath", and vendetta), kinship and hospitality.
Serbian Hajduks, epic
Something about the Bratonožići, epic

Ethnicity 
Miljanov considered himself a Serb. Near the end of his life, Miljanov wrote a letter to one of the Kuči clan leaders. In the letter he writes:

Gallery

See also
 Tomo P. Oraovac

References

Bibliography
 
 
 
 
 

1833 births
1901 deaths
Military personnel from Podgorica
Serbs of Montenegro
People of the Principality of Montenegro
Kuči
Dukes of Montenegro
Writers from Podgorica
Montenegrin poets
Montenegrin male writers
Serbian male poets
Montenegrin–Ottoman War (1876–1878)
19th-century poets